The Weeders is a mid 19th century painting by Jules Breton. Done in oil on canvas, the painting depicts a group of peasant women working the fields of Northern France. The painting is currently in the collection of the Metropolitan Museum of Art.

Description 
Originally a painter of historical scenes, Jules Breton began to shift his focus away from historicity to agrarian scenes. One of the paintings produced as a result of this new focus was The Weeders, which Breton painted after observing a group of farmers in his home town of Courrières picking over a field to clear away weeds and thistle.

References 

Paintings in the collection of the Metropolitan Museum of Art
1868 paintings
Farming in art
Sun in art
Moon in art